Barbat na Rabu is a village on the island of Rab, Croatia. It is connected by the D105 highway.

References

Populated places in Primorje-Gorski Kotar County
Rab